Donwa Dethwelson Lapang (born 10 April 1934), popularly known as Dr. D. D. Lapang, is a politician from Meghalaya, India, and a former Chief Minister of Meghalaya.

He started his life as a road labourer and worked his way up to become Sub-Inspector of schools. His father's name was Donwa War. In 1958, he married Amethyst Lynda Jomes Blah.

In 1972 he became MLA (Member of Legislative Assembly) from Nongpoh as an independent candidate. And later in 1992 to February, 1993 he was the state Chief Minister. On 4 March 2003 he was again sworn in as Chief Minister. He resigned from the position on 15 June 2006 due to dissidence in the coalition government.

He took office as Chief Minister again in March 2007. His party, the Indian National Congress, won a plurality of seats in the March 2008 state legislative election, and Lapang was sworn in as Chief Minister on 10 March 2008, but with the support of only 28 members of the 60 seat legislature, he resigned on 19 March.

He became chief minister for a fourth time on 13 May 2009, after the state was under President's Rule for two months, and resigned on 19 April 2010.

References

 

Indian National Congress politicians from Meghalaya
Lapaang, D. D.
Lapaang, D. D.
Chief Ministers of Meghalaya
Meghalaya MLAs 1972–1978
People from Ri-Bhoi district
Chief ministers from Indian National Congress
State cabinet ministers of Meghalaya
Meghalaya politicians
Meghalaya MLAs 2003–2008
Meghalaya MLAs 2008–2013
National People's Party (India) politicians